Ulrike Knobloch (born 1961), is a German economist at the University of Vechta. Knobloch deals with gender science topics for theoretical economics that takes in real-world problems in social systems.

Knobloch studied economics at the University of Freiburg, graduating with a diploma and taking in additional courses in philosophy. She did her Ph.D. at the University of St. Gallen in economic-ethic, connecting ethical implications with gender issues. Knobloch went on to conduct research in various universities and has also worked for banks. In 2016 she became Junior-Professor at University of Vechta.

Publications

 Biesecker, A., Jochimsen, M., & Knobloch, U. (1997). Vorsorgendes Wirtschaften. Ökologisches Wirtschaften, 12(3-4).
 Knobloch, U. (1994): Reflexion auf die Theorie und Ethik des Konsums.

References

External links 

1961 births
Living people
German economists
University of Freiburg alumni
University of St. Gallen alumni